

John Scott (May 18, 1782 – October 1, 1861) was a Delegate and a U.S. Representative from Missouri.

Born in Hanover County, Virginia in 1782, Scott moved with his parents to Indiana Territory in 1802.
He was graduated from Princeton College in 1805.
He studied law.
He was admitted to the bar and commenced practice in Ste. Genevieve, Missouri, in 1806. He owned slaves.
He presented credentials as a Delegate-elect to the Fourteenth Congress from the Territory of Missouri and served from August 6, 1816, to January 13, 1817, when the election was declared illegal and the seat vacant.

Scott was elected as a Delegate to the Fifteenth and Sixteenth Congresses and served from August 4, 1817, to March 3, 1821.
Upon the admission of Missouri as a State into the Union, John Scott was elected as a Democratic-Republican to the Seventeenth Congress, reelected as an Adams-Clay Republican to the Eighteenth Congress, and elected as an Adams candidate to the Nineteenth Congress and served from August 10, 1821, to March 3, 1827.
He served as chairman of the Committee on Public Lands (Nineteenth Congress).
He was an unsuccessful candidate for reelection in 1826 to the Twentieth Congress.
He resumed the practice of law.
He died in Ste. Genevieve, in Ste. Genevieve County, Missouri, on October 1, 1861.

Personal Life 
Scott had a son, Andre J. Scott who went to the California gold fields.  His son was made the treasurer for the company of gold miners he fell in with.  One of the men, Chas. Orr Baker of Boston, MA asked him to account for a $9 accounting discrepancy.  In a fit of alcohol fueled temper, Andre stabbed the man. His fellow miners found him guilty of murder and hanged near Placerville, California April 3, 1851.  Andre requested to be shot to spare his father's feelings because of his position in society, but was denied after a vote.

References

|-

|-

|-

1782 births
1861 deaths
People from Hanover County, Virginia
Delegates to the United States House of Representatives from Missouri Territory
Democratic-Republican Party members of the United States House of Representatives from Missouri
National Republican Party members of the United States House of Representatives from Missouri
Members of the United States House of Representatives removed by contest
Missouri lawyers
American slave owners
19th-century American lawyers
Princeton University alumni